Christoffel "Christie" van Wyk (born 12 October 1977) is a retired Namibian sprinter who competed in the 100 and 200 metres. He represented his country at two consecutive Summer Olympics starting in 2000.

Competition record

Personal bests
Outdoor
100 metres – 10.09 (+2.0 m/s) (Abilene 2004)
200 metres – 20.50 (+0.8 m/s) (Lappeenranta 2000)
Indoor
60 metres – 6.65 (Houston 2002)
200 metres – 21.54 (Fayetteville 2001)

References

External links

1977 births
Living people
Namibian male sprinters
Olympic athletes of Namibia
Athletes (track and field) at the 2000 Summer Olympics
Athletes (track and field) at the 2004 Summer Olympics
Commonwealth Games competitors for Namibia
Athletes (track and field) at the 1998 Commonwealth Games
Athletes (track and field) at the 2002 Commonwealth Games
World Athletics Championships athletes for Namibia
Athletes (track and field) at the 1999 All-Africa Games
African Games competitors for Namibia
20th-century Namibian people
21st-century Namibian people